Aquilla is an unincorporated community in Stoddard County, in the U.S. state of Missouri.

History
A post office called Aquilla was established in 1892, and remained in operation until 1908. Some say the name Aquilla is Latin meaning "eagle", while others believe Aquilla is named after a character in the Bible.

In 1925, Aquilla had 45 inhabitants.

References

Unincorporated communities in Stoddard County, Missouri
Unincorporated communities in Missouri
1892 establishments in Missouri